5:14 Fluoxytine Seagull Alcohol John Nicotine is the debut solo album by Scottish singer-songwriter Malcolm Middleton, released on 26 September 2002 on Chemikal Underground.

Overview
In 2002, Middleton, writing lyrics and singing for the first time, recorded and released 5:14 Fluoxytine Seagull Alcohol John Nicotine. Middleton has commented on the album, saying

Track listing

Personnel
Malcolm Middleton – guitar, vocals
Paul Savage – producer
Aidan Moffat – vocals
Emma Pollock – vocals
Alun Woodward – vocals
James Woods – vocals
Geoff Allan
Barry Burns – vocals
Stewart Henderson – vocals
Jenny Reeve – vocals

Release history
5:14 Fluoxytine Seagull Alcohol John Nicotine was released in various countries in 2002.

Notes

2002 debut albums
Malcolm Middleton albums
Chemikal Underground albums